The Optare Spectra was a double-decker bus body built on the DAF (now VDL) DB250 chassis between 1991 and 2006.

The vehicle was developed as a joint project between Optare and DAF; it was based on the designs of the successful MCW Metrobus, the design rights of which had been jointly purchased by DAF and Optare in 1989 following the collapse of Metro Cammell Weymann. With the launch of the DB250LF chassis sometime after production commenced, the Spectra was built to low-floor specification, and was one of the first low-floor double-decker buses available in the United Kingdom. The design is notable for the exclusion of a lower deck rear window, a practice that has become more commonplace. The bus typically seated 47 on the upper deck and 28 on the lower deck in single-door format.

Operations

Notable operators
Wilts & Dorset were the single biggest operator of Optare Spectras, ordering 78 from the early 1990s to 2002. Arriva Yorkshire, the second-largest operator of the type  purchased a total of 42 low-floor Spectras, purchasing 18 in 1999 and another 24 in 2002. Some of these were cascaded to the former Yorkshire Tiger operation.

Reading Buses purchased the first production model of the Spectra, going on to purchase an additional 25 more to 2001, while London Buses purchased a total of 25 Spectras in 1992 as replacements for AEC Routemasters. All but one of these were delivered to the London Central subsidiary with a single door arrangement, while Metroline received a single dual door example for evaluating a replacement for MCW Metrobuses on route 16. Elsewhere in London, Capital Logistics received a delayed order of six dual door Spectras in 1999 for their operation of route 60. These, as well as the single Metroline example, were the only dual door right-hand drive Spectras.

In addition to the first two low-floor Spectras delivered in 1998, a £3million repeat batch of 20 Spectras were purchased in 1999 by Travel West Midlands to upgrade West Midlands bus route 50. One of these were destroyed by fire in 2001. These were replaced on the 50 in late 2001 by Volvo B7TL/Alexander ALX400s, and following later refurbishment, were withdrawn in October 2015.

31 left-hand drive dual door Spectras were produced for operators in Turkey, with 26 being produced for IETT in Istanbul and five being produced for İzulaş in İzmir. İzmir's Spectras were finished in London Buses red and tapegrey livery as the city's mayor was impressed by the liveries of London Central's Spectras.

Other operators of the Optare Spectra include Eastbourne Buses, who took on 12 Spectras in 1997, while three low-floor Spectras were also delivered to Isle of Man Transport in 2000.

Production of the Optare Spectra ceased when the final two rolled off the line in late 2006, with the last Optare Spectra being built for Anglian Bus, who later sold it to Auckland Explorer, in Auckland, New Zealand.

First UK low-floor double deckers

The first completed low-floor Optare Spectra, R1 NEG, was received by the National Express Group in January 1998. However, the first low-floor example of the Optare Spectra to enter service was with Abus of Bristol on 4 February 1998. This was the first low-floor, fully accessible double-decker bus to enter service in the United Kingdom. The bus was destroyed by fire in 2015.

The National Express Group also received their first two low-floor Spectras in 1998, allocating one to Travel West Midlands and one to Travel Dundee, registered as R1 NEG and R2 NEG, respectively. They entered service on 15 January 1998, branded as Britain's first "Low Floor Low Emissions Easy Access Double Decker" and Scotland's first "Low Floor Low Emissions Easy Access Double Decker". R2 NEG was subsequently transferred to Travel West Midlands in August 1999. Both buses have since been preserved, with R1 NEG being restored to original Travel West Midlands condition at the Wythall transport museum.

See also

List of buses

References

External links

Double-decker buses
Low-floor buses
Spectra
Vehicles introduced in 1991